Sad Hunk is the fifth studio album by Canadian musician Bahamas, released October 9, 2020. The album's release was preceded by the preview single "Own Alone" in August, with "Trick to Happy" following in September.

The album won the Juno Award for Adult Alternative Album of the Year at the Juno Awards of 2021.

Track listing

Charts

References 

2020 albums
Bahamas (musician) albums
Juno Award for Adult Alternative Album of the Year albums